Lego Produktions AG Schweiz was a major production facility in Baar, Switzerland for the Lego toy company, from 1974 to 2004. At the time its closing was announced in 2001, 30% of the world production of Lego was produced at the Baar facility. The Baar facility eventually closed in 2004 and Lego's remaining Swiss production facilities closed in 2005.

History

Beginnings
The founder of Lego, Ole Kirk Christiansen, discovered an office building of Kenwood AG on a large property in Baar while returning from Zurich Airport and chose that location to be the site of the factory.

Once the building was purchased, it served as the Swiss headquarters and operating center. Construction of production halls was started; and since existing steel beams and concrete elements were used, the construction did not take long. This was the first Lego factory outside of Denmark. Since the factory was established in the Lättich area of Baar, it was named Lego Lättich.

Expansion
To satisfy increasing demand, the production area around Hall 2 was expanded into Halls 3 and 4. Injection-mould construction and research-and-development were also situated in Hall 4. With this expansion, the space at this location was exhausted. With a total of 213 injection-molding machines, the production site was the largest such plant in Switzerland. The waste heat generated during the injection molding process was used to heat the nearby Lättich Baar municipal indoor and outdoor swimming pools (German: Hallen- und Freibad Lättich). After the close of the production plant, the swimming pool had to purchase a wood-fired heating system.

As demand continued to grow, the tool shop was moved to a new building in Steinhausen, with a repair workshop set up in its stead. Since more space was needed, another production facility, Lego Neuhof, was built in the area of Neuhof, in Baar. The new facility could handle more stages of production than the Lättich one, performing not only injection molding but also assembly, high-frequency welding, pad printing, and packaging. Full crates of Lego parts were automatically taken from the injection-molding machines, shipped to a high-rack warehouse, and replaced by empty crates. The research department was outsourced from Lättich to a new building, along with a product development department and an exhibition model building department in Rumentikon / Hagendorn ZG  (Cham). Since toolmaking in Steinhausen and Hohenwestedt, Germany, were no longer sufficient to produce enough new injection moulds, another tool shop was built in Au, St. Gallen.

In 1993, a new factory was built for Lego in Willisau. The architecture was characterized by a main entrance, beyond which were  passageways connecting to the various production halls on either side. The Willisau facility also had its own railroad, which connected to the Swiss Federal Railways network. In addition to injection moulding, printing, assembly, and packaging, Willisau also operated a blow-wax machine for Bionicol packaging, and two deep-drawing machines for the production of Lego building boards.

Closure
In 1998, Lego confronted a crisis. In the course of this crisis, model-building and product development were closed in Rumentikon, but the research and development department remained. The tool shop in Au was sold to Otto Mannes GmbH (Barnes Group Inc.), which hired the entire staff.

After this phase, the Lego Group recovered in the short term. At this time, the idea for a Legoland amusement park in Rotkreuz, in the canton of Zug, was raised. However, the project could not be implemented because the farmers concerned in Rotkreuz were not willing to sell their land. At the beginning of 2000, the Lego Group closed its factory in the USA and withdrew the external production of the watch series "Lego-Watch". All the injection-moulding machines from the discontinued operations were integrated into the Lättich and Neuhof factories.

At the beginning of 2001, due to lower profits, it was decided that the Lättich production site should be abandoned completely within six months, and the Neuhof production site within one year. Out of 950 employees, 400 would be laid off. Effectively, however, the closures were postponed for over a year. The Neuhof plant was taken over by the Swiss Post for a sorting center and by the transport company Bucher Bitsch for a storage location. The Lättich plant now houses a number of companies, the largest is the Speckprint AG printing company, which also produces the Zuger Amtsblatt. Research and development (research involving various plastics and production processes) has also been closed. The toolmaking in Steinhausen was sold to Wisi'on Tool AG in 2005. Wisi'on Tool could rely on further orders from Lego, and no closure was planned for Willisau. The Lego Group adopted a new strategy, the licensing of Lego products to Chinese companies. Therefore, in 2005, production in Willisau was also closed. The Competec Group (Brack, Alltron, ...) acquired the Lego site in Willisau, in 2011, of 55,000 square meters.

Today, only the sales and finance departments of Lego are located in Switzerland.

Products
The following Lego products were manufactured in Switzerland:
 Lego Primo
 Lego Duplo
 Lego Technic
 Lego Bionicle

Technical equipment

Lego mainly used injection-moulding machines from Arburg (Germany) and Engel (Austria), but also machines from Battenfeld (Austria) and Klöckner-Werke (Germany). No more than six two-component machines were used in the Lättich plant. Most of the accessories used for extraction, heating control, and post-processing were developed and built by Lego itself. In the case of the water-cooling appliances, Lego used only HB-Therm temperature control units. Lego pieces were first stored in cardboard boxes and then in uniform plastic containers of various sizes. Although all these plastic containers were intended exclusively for internal use in the Lego Group, they were not produced by Lego, but by an external manufacturer, exclusively for lego.

Education and training
Lego offered the following apprenticeships in Switzerland:
 Merchant
 Computer scientist
 Warehouseman
 Electrician
 Toolmaker / PolyMechanic
 Plastic technologist

The second specialty in plastic processing, thermoset processing, was taught at Isopress AG.

References

External links
 SwissLUG, Swiss LEGO club
 steinCHenwelt, Swiss LEGO exhibition

Defunct toy manufacturers
Lego
Manufacturing companies established in 1974
Manufacturing companies disestablished in 2005
Manufacturing companies of Switzerland
Toy companies of Switzerland
Swiss companies established in 1974
Swiss companies disestablished in 2005